Northern Parkway is a major road that runs west–east across the northern part of the city Baltimore. For most of the way, it is at least six lanes wide, and it is used by motorists for crosstown travel. It is designated E. Northern Pkwy and W. Northern Pkwy with Charles Street being the dividing line. It was constructed in the 1950s through several neighborhoods and several homes were razed in the process from right-of-way. The section of E. Northern Pkwy from Harford Road to Fleetwood Ave was originally called German Lane.

Northern Parkway starts in the west at Liberty Heights Avenue in Northwest Baltimore's Lochearn community, and in the east at Belair Road in Overlea, Maryland. The road forms the northern boundary of Pimlico Racetrack. As the road moves eastward across Charles Street, Northern Parkway narrows becomes a residential street and part of Baltimore's Homeland neighborhood. From York Road east to Harford Road, northern Parkway is primarily lined with row houses and single family homes.  Before intersecting with Bel Air Road, Northern Parkway splits into two one-way streets at Belford Ave in North East Baltimore City at the border between the Woodring and Raspeburg neighborhoods. The eastbound section becomes Fleetwood Ave at the intersection of Walther Ave. The westbound portion remains E. Northern Parkway; however its former name was Maple Ave.

History
Parts of E. Northern Parkway used to be Belvedere Avenue (parts of West Belvedere Avenue and East Belvedere Avenue still remain).

Between 1950 and 1976, parts of Northern Parkway were expanded to six lanes with a median from Bellona Avenue east.  Northern Parkway was built in various stages extending west from Old Harford Road to Hillen Road from the early 1950s to 1965.  In 1973-75, work on the new section near York Road resulted in the demolition of businesses along York Road north of Belvedere Avenue, with at least one east west alley also being vacated by the city of Baltimore.  The part of Northern Parkway near York Road was opened to traffic in December 1976; the section between The Alameda and Chinquapin Parkway was completed in June 1975.

The original plan included for W. Northern Parkway to pass through Powder Mill park and connect to Security Blvd near the unfinished I-70 interchange in Gwynns Falls Park.

In 2011 the Television show Extreme Home Makeover built a home on a vacant corner lot in the 3800 block of Fleetwood Ave. Several production trucks were housed on E. Northern Pkwy.

Junction list

Points of interest
Notable Landmarks from East to West on or near W. & E. Northern Parkway include:

Northern Parkway Jr High
Norman Carlberg Sculpture at the entrance of Northern Parkway Junior High
Mount Pleasant Park and Golf Course Where in 1956, Arnold Palmer secured his second win on the professional golf tour. Mount Pleasant is a Golf Digest 4-star rated golf course and was ranked 12th Best Municipal Golf Course in the United States by Golf week Magazine.
Northern High School
Mercy High School
Chinquapin Park
Senator Theater
Gilman School
Bryn Mawr School
Roland Park Country School
St. Mary's Seminary the first ecclesiastical faculty in the United States with the right to grant degrees in the name of the Holy See.
The Cathedral of Mary Our Queen
Pimlico Middle School
Pimlico Race Course
Polk Audio Headquarters
Rogers Avenue Metro Subway Station
Sinai Hospital

Public transportation
There is no single bus line that travels the entire length of Northern Parkway. However, there are buses operating on various portions of the route, operated by the Maryland Transit Administration.

From Reisterstown Road to York Road, service is provided by Route 44. Route 36 operates from York Road to The Alameda, and Route 55 from McLean Boulevard to Belair Road, and Route 58 operates the longest distance of all, serving all points east of Falls Road. All other areas of Northern Parkway are within a close walk of a bus line.

In addition, there are many lines that either cross or operate on small portions of Northern Parkway. These include Routes 1, 3, 8, 11, 15, 19, 27, 52, 53,  54, 61, and 91.

The Rogers Avenue Metro Subway Station is located near Northern Parkway, and the Mt. Washington Light Rail Stop is about a mile away.

Route 66 once operated along Northern Parkway from Springlake Way to Belair Road, but this was eliminated in 1993. Route M-8 ran along Northern Parkway from Wabash Avenue to Liberty Road until it was rerouted in 2005.

References

Streets in Baltimore
Northern Baltimore